Ben Ali is a neighborhood located within the city of Sacramento, California, United States.
According to The Ben Ali Community Association, the boundaries of the neighborhood are:
 North - Marconi Avenue.
 South - El Camino Avenue.
 East - Capital City Freeway.
 West - Auburn Boulevard.
The Ben Ali community was named for James Ben Ali Haggin who owned much of the ranch later subdivided into these streets as well as adjacent neighborhoods.

Ben Ali is represented by Sean Loloee -District 2, on the Sacramento City Council.

References

Neighborhoods in Sacramento, California